The Truth in Me is the first released solo album by Cure keyboardist Roger O'Donnell. It was recorded in Devon, England using only the Minimoog Voyager synthesizer as a sound source, plus vocals by Erin Lang. MIDI and audio were captured in the software program Digital Performer. Mixing was done at Uphon Studios in Germany and mastered at The Exchange in London.

Track listing
"My Days"
"For the Truth in You"
"The Truth in Me"
"Not Without You"
"He Sent You Angels"
"Treasure"
"This Is a Story"
"This Grey Morning"
"Tired of All This"
"...And So I Close My Eyes"

Recording
Following inclusion of the song "Another Year Away" on the Moog Documentary Soundtrack, O'Donnell was encouraged by one of the producers of the film to do an entire album orchestrated with a Minimoog Voyager. Because O'Donnell had enjoyed working with it on the soundtrack, the idea appealed to him.

This record was released on O'Donnell's 99 Times Out of 10 Records.

External links
 The Truth in Me at Treble Zine (review)

References

Roger O'Donnell albums
1999 debut albums